Aydın Dağdelen (born 15 April 1971) is a retired Turkish football goalkeeper.

References

1971 births
Living people
Turkish footballers
Altay S.K. footballers
Diyarbakırspor footballers
Association football goalkeepers
Süper Lig players